Lorelei Elise Bachman (born May 20, 1973) is a Canadian writer and songwriter.

Personal life
Bachman is from Surrey, British Columbia, Canada. She is the daughter of Canadian rocker Randy Bachman of the classic rock bands The Guess Who and Bachman Turner Overdrive, and sister of pop musician Tal Bachman.

Bachman is of German, Scottish, Ukrainian and British descent. She accompanied her father and siblings to Germany for the CBC Genealogy program "Who Do You Think You Are?"

Career
Bachman has written pop music for recording artists as well as thematic music for television and theatre. She co-wrote several selections for Koba Entertainment's Follow Your Berry Own Beat. Her music was also featured in the television series Edgemont.

Bachman is a published author. Her children’s book "Margo Madagascar" was published by Quarry Press in 2015 and featured at Word Vancouver 2016. Her second book, "Quiet Like Me" is soon to be released. Bachman was a regular column contributor for The Early Childhood Coalition. In addition, Bachman has written for print and online publications. She currently works as Social Media & Marketing Specialist for Vinyl Tap on Corus Radio.

Education
Bachman holds a Bachelor of Arts in sociology and a Master of Arts in Integrated Studies in Cultural Studies from Athabasca University. Her thesis: "My Story or Yours: Challenges, Criticisms and Collaboration in Native Autobiography by Non-Native Collectors" was published by Athabasca University Press and is featured on the Indigenous Studies program portal at the University of Saskatchewan. She also holds a DÉLF language proficiency diploma from the French Ministry of Education and a diploma in pâtisserie from Dubrulle International Culinary School, now known as The Art Institute of Vancouver.

Television

Radio

Print

References

1973 births
Canadian people of German descent
Canadian people of Ukrainian descent
Canadian pop singers
Canadian singer-songwriters
Former Latter Day Saints
Living people
Canadian women singer-songwriters
21st-century Canadian women singers